Hicksonella is a genus of corals belonging to the family Gorgoniidae.

The species of this genus are found in Malesia and Northern Australia.

Species:

Hicksonella expansa 
Hicksonella guishanensis 
Hicksonella princeps

References

Gorgoniidae
Octocorallia genera